Deutsche Schule Toulouse is a German international school in Colomiers, France, near Toulouse, serving years 1–12. It has two campuses: the school administration, kindergarten, and primary school are located at the Eurocampus 2,

The campus is shared with the International School of Toulouse. Secondary classes of years 6-12 (collège or junior high school and lycée or senior high school/sixth form) are located at the Lycée International Victor-Hugo.

References

External links
 

Lycées in Haute-Garonne
Education in Toulouse
German international schools in France